Celso-Léon Lê Văn Đệ (24 August 1906 – 16 March 1966) was a South Vietnamese painter who designed the South Vietnamese flag.

Early life and education
A Roman Catholic, he was born in Mỏ Cày, Bến Tre, and was in charge of Asian Arts at the International Exhibition of Catholic Press at Vatican in 1936. He established the École supérieure nationale des Beaux Arts in Saigon.

Career
Some of his works have been shown at the Vietnam National Museum of Fine Arts, Hanoi. Others are exhibited in Europe. A wall panel, Mater Amabilis and Saint Magdalene at the food of the cross was on show at the Missionaria Arte museum at the Vatican.

He died in Saigon.

References

1906 births
1966 deaths
20th-century Vietnamese painters
Flag designers
Vietnamese Roman Catholics
People from Bến Tre Province